In the Book of Mormon, Limhi was the third and final king of the second Nephite habitation of the land of Lehi-Nephi.  He succeeded his father, Noah. Led by Ammon (a mulekite) Limhi escaped from the Lamanites with his people to the land of Zarahemla.

Lineage

Etymology
According to the Brigham Young University, Lim might mean people/nation and hi might mean alive/live in Hebrew. So the name might mean: "the people live," that is, "the people are preserved alive."

Teachings
King Limhi identified for his subjects three results of bondage. According to Monte S. Nyman, these three results were apparently all drawn from their scriptures, the Brass Plates, since he was quoting the Lord. Abbreviated, the results are:

 The people do not prosper, and their activities are stumbling blocks. 
 If the Lord's people sow filthiness, they will reap chaff; the effect is poison. 
 If the Lord's people sow filthiness, they will reap the east wind and destruction.

The last result needs a little explanation. In Palestine, from which the Brass Plates came, the east wind brings in the hot temperatures from the desert, resulting in drought and famine. In contrast, the winds from the west bring in the rains from the Mediterranean Sea, resulting in good crops.

Covenants
According to Blake Ostler, the clearest examples of covenant renewal festivals are found at the time King Benjamin gave his speech (see -) and at the time of King Limhi's gathering. Although King Limhi gathered his people just three years after King Benjamin's speech and assembly, Limhi's people had been separated from the rest of the Nephites/Mulekites for three generations.

Praise
John Gee said about him: "The Book of Mormon implies that Limhi knew his scriptures (in the broadest and most basic sense of the word: writing in general). Limhi, as a passionate scripturist, was the first to want to read the record of a lost people contained in twenty-four golden plates, that matter engaging his attention even before he attempted to rescue his people (–) or get out of the fifty-percent tax bracket (contrast). Limhi's passionate interest in records and scriptures might also explain why he was righteous in spite of the wickedness of his father, the court, and the people in general. Furthermore, unlike Noah and his priests, Limhi takes these things seriously. We need look no further than Limhi for reasons to be serious about studying our scriptures."

Comparison with Alma
L. Tom Perry compared the people of Limhi with the people of Alma the Elder and said: "What was the difference between the people of Alma and the people of King Limhi? Obviously, there were several differences: the people of Alma were peaceful and more righteous; they had already been baptized and entered into a covenant with the Lord; they humbled themselves before the Lord even before their tribulations started. All these differences made it appropriate and fair that the Lord would deliver them quickly in a miraculous way from the hand which kept them in bondage. These scriptures teach us of the Lord's power of deliverance."

See also

 King Noah
 The Record of Zeniff
 Zeniff

Notes

References
 
 Spendlove, Loren Blake. . Limhi's Discourse: Proximity and Distance in Teaching. Interpreter: A Journal of Mormon Scripture 8 (2014): 1-6.

External links

 
 People of Limhi Compared to People of Alma

Book of Mormon people